The women's tournament of basketball at the 2000 Olympics at Sydney, Australia began on September 16 and ended on September 30, when the United States defeated Australia 76–54 for the gold medal. Preliminary round games were held at The Dome and elimination games at the Sydney SuperDome.

Qualifying

Format
 Twelve teams are split into 2 preliminary round groups of 6 teams each. The top 4 teams from each group qualify for the knockout stage.
 Fifth and sixth-placed teams from each group are ranked 9th–12th in two additional matches.
 In the quarterfinals, the matchups are as follows: A1 vs. B4, A2 vs. B3, A3 vs. B2 and A4 vs. B1.
The eliminated teams at the quarterfinals are ranked 5th–8th in two additional matches.
 The winning teams from the quarterfinals meet in the semifinals as follows: A3/B2 vs. A1/B4 and A2/B3 vs. A4/B1.
 The winning teams from the semifinals dispute the gold medal. The losing teams dispute the bronze.

Ties are broken via the following the criteria, with the first option used first, all the way down to the last option:
 Head to head results
 Goal average (not the goal difference) between the tied teams
 Goal average of the tied teams for all teams in its group

Squads

Preliminary round
The four best teams from each group advanced to the quarterfinal round.

Group A

Group B

Classification games

Knockout stage

Quarterfinals

Semifinals

Bronze medal game

Gold medal game

Awards

Final standings

References

 Official Olympic Report la84foundation.org. Accessed June 10, 2011.

 
Women
Basketball at the Summer Olympics – Women's tournament